WYAR (88.3 MHz) is a non-commercial radio station broadcasting an Adult standards radio format.  Licensed to Yarmouth, Maine, United States, with the transmitter and tower located on nearby Cousins Island, the station serves the Portland, Maine and Lewiston-Auburn, Maine area.  The station is licensed to Heritage Radio Society, Inc., a 501(c)(3) non-profit corporation.

WYAR has a large collection of more than 10,000 78-rpm records, many of which have been enhanced by digital signal processing.  The station also airs some early jazz programming and community issues and news.

See also
List of community radio stations in the United States

References

External links

YAR
Community radio stations in the United States
Yarmouth, Maine
Radio stations established in 1998